Jane Chabria (1940–2004) was an education pioneer in Columbus, Ohio.  She is credited with opening the first Montessori pre-school in Columbus, called the Early Learning Center.  She has Montessori school named after her called Jane's Montessori Academy.

References

20th-century American educators
Montessori teachers
1940 births
2004 deaths